Viliame Rarasea (born 1 April 1993) is a Fijian rugby union player who currently plays as a lock for  in New Zealand's domestic Mitre 10 Cup.

Senior career

Rarasea made his senior debut for the Counties Manukau Steelers during the 2013 ITM Cup, however that was to be his only appearance during the campaign.   He played six times off the replacements bench the following year before establishing himself as more of a regular in 2015 and then making a career high 10 starting appearances in 2016.

International

Rarasea was a member of the Fiji Under 20 side which competed in the 2013 IRB Junior World Championship in France, making 3 appearances and scoring 1 try.

References

External links

1993 births
Living people
Fijian rugby union players
People educated at Sacred Heart College, Auckland
Rugby union locks
Counties Manukau rugby union players
Fijian emigrants to New Zealand
Fijian Drua players